"Dom Har Glömt" ("They've Forgotten") was the first single from Agnetha Fältskog's fifth Swedish solo album Elva kvinnor i ett hus. It was written by Agnetha with lyrics by Bosse Carlgren.

The song on the B-side, "Gulleplutt", was the Swedish language recording of the song "Golliwog", which was released the year before. Some singles seem to include "Golliwog" instead of "Gulleplutt"on the B-side as reported on www.abbasite.com.

The single failed to reach the Svensktoppen and the official sale charts did not release sale figures at that time so the position of this single is not known.

She performed "Dom Har Glömt" and "Tack För En Underbar, Vanlig Dag" live on TV in August 1975.

1975 singles
Agnetha Fältskog songs
Songs written by Agnetha Fältskog
1975 songs
Songs written by Bosse Carlgren
CBS Records singles